The Comper C.L.A.7 Swift is a British 1930s single-seat sporting aircraft produced by Comper Aircraft Company Ltd of Hooton Park, Cheshire.

Design and development
In March 1929 Flight Lieutenant Nicholas Comper left the Royal Air Force and formed the Comper Aircraft Company to build an aircraft he had designed, the Comper Swift. He had previously designed and flown three aircraft for the Cranwell Light Aeroplane Club: the C.L.A.2, C.L.A.3 and C.L.A.4.

The prototype Swift (registered G-AARX) first flew at Hooton Park in January 1930. The aircraft was a small single-seat, braced high-wing monoplane constructed of fabric-covered spruce wood frames. The first Swift was powered by a 40 hp (30 kW) ABC Scorpion piston engine. After successful tests, seven more aircraft were built in 1930, powered by a 50 hp Salmson A.D.9 radial engine. Trials with Pobjoy P radial engine for use in air racing resulted in all the subsequent aircraft being powered by the Pobjoy R. The last three factory-built aircraft (sometimes called the Gipsy Swift) were fitted with de Havilland Gipsy engines – two with 120 hp (89 kW) Gipsy Major III, and one with a 130 hp (97 kW) Gipsy Major. In 1931, Arthur Butler flew G-ABRE to Australia in nine days. After touring the Eastern States, the Swift had covered twenty three thousand miles. One of the Gipsy Swifts, owned by the then-Prince of Wales and future King Edward VIII, won second place in the 1932 King's Cup Race while being flown by his personal pilot. Postwar, surviving Swifts continued to compete successfully in UK air races into the mid-1950s.

Survivors

EC-HAM Airworthy, displayed at Cuatro Vientos, Madrid, Spain. Owned by Fundación Infante de Orleans. Formerly G-ABUU, now painted to represent "EC-AAT" "Ciudad de Manila" as flown by Fernando R. Loring for his March 1933 flight Madrid-Manila.
G-ABTC Stored, in Cornwall.
G-ABUS Stored, believed in France.
G-ACGL On display, RAF Museum, Cosford.
G-ACTF Airworthy, displayed at the Shuttleworth Collection, Old Warden, England
G-LCGL Airworthy (replica)
LV-FBA Stored, in Argentina. Also, a second Comper Swift flew in Argentina. Parts saved and stored in Buenos Aires after accident in San Justo 1950– Owner Vicente Bonvisutto (Reg.G-AAZE R-232 LV-YEA LV-FCE)
VH-ACG (Gipsy engine) Airworthy This aircraft was shipped to Oshkosh, USA for the EAA Airventure fly-in, and will be shipped back to Australia after the show.
VH-UVC Stored, in Sydney, Australia. - According to Classic Wings Magazine, VH-UVC took to the skies for the first time in 55 years on 20 November 2017 at Omaka Airfield, Blenheim, New Zealand.

A new-build aircraft, registered G-ECTF, and built according to the original plans, with a Pobjoy Cataract engine, flew for the first time on 2 October 2015.

Operators

Spanish Republican Air Force

Specifications (C.L.A.7 Swift)

See also

Notes

References
Boughton, Terence. 1963. The Story of The British Light Aeroplane. John Murray

Meaden, Jack & Fillmore, Malcolm. (Winter 2003). The Comper Lightplanes. Air-Britain Archive (quarterly). Air-Britain. 
Meaden, Jack & Fillmore, Malcolm. (Autumn 2004). The Comper Lightplanes. Air-Britain Archive (quarterly). Air-Britain. 
Meaden, Jack & Fillmore, Malcolm. (Winter 2004). The Comper Lightplanes. Air-Britain Archive (quarterly). Air-Britain. 
Riding, Richard T. 1987. Ultralights: The Early British Classics. Patrick Stephens 
Riding, Richard T. March 2003. Database: Comper Swift. Aeroplane Monthly. IPC Media
Smith, Ron. 2005. British Built Aircraft Vol.5: Northern England, Scotland, Wales and Northern Ireland 

Follet, Neil (ed.) 2021. Aviation Heritage Vol52, No.2. The Arrivals - C.A. Butler. Journal of Aviation Historical Society of Australia Inc. ISSN 0815-4392

External links

Australian civil aircraft register search
Comper Swift – British Aircraft Directory
https://www.flickr.com/photos/airventure2009/3758521992/
Nick Comper official website - suspended before 3 November 2020

1930s British sport aircraft
Swift
Aircraft first flown in 1930
Single-engined tractor aircraft
High-wing aircraft